Mob Town is a 2019 American crime film directed by Danny A. Abeckaser and starring David Arquette, Jamie-Lynn Sigler, Jennifer Esposito, Nick Cordero, Robert Davi and Abeckaser.

Premise 
Based on the true story of a New York State Trooper who investigates the Apalachin meeting, a gathering of high-profile mobsters in his small town of Apalachin, New York

Plot Summary 
On November 14, 1957, over 100 of the most notorious organized crime figures from all over the United States held a historic meeting in the small town of Apalachin, New York.

The meeting was ordered by Vito Genovese, who at the time successfully eliminated two of his biggest rivals, Frank Costello and Albert Anastasia. Genovese, who was the current boss of the Luciano crime family decided to consolidate power and announce to the underworld  that it was his time to be Capo Dei Capi, “the boss of bosses.”

In the upstate New York town of Apalachin, Sgt. Edgar Croswell, a 40 year-old divorced state trooper who lived in the police station, began noticing strange and unusual activity in the small town. A semi-retired mobster named Joseph Barbara, known as "Joe the Barber” had recently bought a nearby ginger ale bottling plant and a 53 acre estate just outside of town. Genovese decided to hold the historical summit at the Barbara Estate. Much of the film revolves around planning for the meeting.

Sgt. Croswell tried to alert local law enforcement and even the FBI, but his warnings were ignored. At the time, the FBI was so focused on fighting Communism the long-time FBI director J. Edgar Hoover refused publicly accept the existence of a "National Crime Syndicate" and the need to address organized crime in America.

Despite constant push back, Sgt. Croswell refused to back down and began investigating Joe the Barber, and his businesses in town. After stumbling on a major clue that Joe the Barber had not only purchased every piece of meat and fish in town, he also realized the every single motel room in town was booked

Without any back up, Croswell and handful of local police officers busted the meeting and arrested 58 of the most notorious Mafia figures.

Although all the arrests were eventually overturned, Sgt. Croswell single handedly forced the FBI to publicly acknowledge the existence of an organized crime syndicate in America, leading J. Edgar Hoover to create an organized crime task force.

This also led to the creation of the RICO (Racketeer Influenced and Corrupt Organizations) act which law enforcement agencies currently use to fight organized crime.

Cast
David Arquette as Sgt. Ed Croswell
Jennifer Esposito as Natalie Passatino
Jamie-Lynn Sigler as Josephine Barbara
Nick Cordero as Vincent Gigante
Robert Davi as Vito Genovese
P. J. Byrne as Vincent Vasisko
Gino Cafarelli as Carmine Galante
Danny A. Abeckaser as Joe Barbara

Reception
At Metacritic the film has a weighted average score of 24 out of 100, based on four critics, indicating "generally unfavorable reviews".

References

External links
 
 

American crime drama films
Saban Films films
Films set in 1957
2010s English-language films
2010s American films